"Midnight by the Morphy Watch" is a horror fiction story about chess, written by American author Fritz Leiber. It was first published in If, in July 1974.

The story is one of a series of works by Leiber whose settings are places that he inhabited, and whose protagonists are based on himself.

Synopsis

When amateur chessplayer Stirf Ritter-Rebil (a "quasi-anagrammatic" version of "Fritz Reuter Leiber") purchases the custom-made pocket watch which once belonged to Paul Morphy, his own chess skills are supernaturally boosted — but he also begins to experience side effects.

Reception

"Midnight by the Morphy Watch" was a finalist for the 1975 Hugo Award for Best Novelette, and was ranked ninth in the 1975 Locus Award for Best Short Story. Mike Ashley called it "chilling".

References

Works originally published in If (magazine)
Works by Fritz Leiber
Short stories about chess